Palazzo Donà Balbi is a palace in Venice, Italy, located in the Santa Croce district, overlooking the right side of the Grand Canal on the Riva di Biasio foundation opposite Palazzo Flangini and the church of San Geremia.

History
The current building was built in the 17th century—most likely by joining three adjacent buildings. Owned by the Province of Venice, the building is the seat of the regional school office.

Architecture
The simple plastered façade is divided into three vertical parts with the rightmost being the main one and offering the only access door. The noble floors on the right are decorated with quadriforas supported by balconies and flanked by a single-light windows on their left side. The other two parts of the palace feature rows of triplets of single-light windows, with those on the left not homogeneously positioned. All the openings are with round arches surmounted by frames. The stone-clad ground floor has signs of two secondary access gates closed over time.

See also
Palazzo Donà
Palazzo Donà a Sant'Aponal
Palazzo Donà Giovannelli
Palazzo Donà della Madoneta
Palazzo Donà-Ottobon

References

Houses completed in the 17th century
Donà Balbi
Donà Balbi
Renaissance architecture in Venice